The 2013–14 season will be Diósgyőri VTK's 48th competitive season, 3rd consecutive season in the OTP Bank Liga and 103rd year in existence as a football club.

First team squad

Transfers

Summer

In:

Out:

Winter

In:

Out:

List of Hungarian football transfers summer 2013
List of Hungarian football transfers winter 2013–14

Statistics

Appearances and goals
Last updated on 1 June 2014.

|-
|colspan="14"|Youth players:

|-
|colspan="14"|Out to loan:

|-
|colspan="14"|Players no longer at the club:

|}

Top scorers
Includes all competitive matches. The list is sorted by shirt number when total goals are equal.

Last updated on 1 June 2014

Disciplinary record
Includes all competitive matches. Players with 1 card or more included only.

Last updated on 1 June 2014

Overall
{|class="wikitable"
|-
|Games played || 51 (30 OTP Bank Liga, 8 Hungarian Cup and 13 Hungarian League Cup)
|-
|Games won || 23 (12 OTP Bank Liga, 4 Hungarian Cup and 7 Hungarian League Cup)
|-
|Games drawn || 17 (11 OTP Bank Liga, 3 Hungarian Cup and 3 Hungarian League Cup)
|-
|Games lost || 11 (7 OTP Bank Liga, 1 Hungarian Cup and 3 Hungarian League Cup)
|-
|Goals scored || 86
|-
|Goals conceded || 64
|-
|Goal difference || +22
|-
|Yellow cards || 115
|-
|Red cards || 10
|-
|rowspan="1"|Worst discipline ||  Márkó Futács (11 , 1 )
|-
|rowspan="1"|Best result || 7–1 (H) v Kisvárda – Ligakupa – 20-11-2013
|-
|rowspan="2"|Worst result || 0–4 (A) v Debrecen – OTP Bank Liga – 11-08-2013
|-
| 0–4 (H) v Paks – OTP Bank Liga – 26-04-2014
|-
|rowspan="1"|Most appearances ||  Patrik Bacsa (45 appearances)
|-
|rowspan="1"|Top scorer ||  Patrik Bacsa (17 goals)
|-
|Points || 86/153 (56.21%)
|-

Nemzeti Bajnokság I

Matches

Classification

Results summary

Results by round

Hungarian Cup

League Cup

Group stage

Classification

Knockout phase

Pre-season

References

External links
 Eufo
 Official Website
 UEFA
 fixtures and results

Diósgyőri VTK seasons
Hungarian football clubs 2013–14 season